Llynclys railway station was a station in Llynclys, Shropshire, England. The station was opened on 1 May 1860 and closed on 18 January 1965.

Present day

The station remains as a private residence but both platforms have been filled in and the trackbed forms a garden. The Cambrian Heritage Railway have hopes to reconnect the line from Oswestry to Pant but have run into a problem with completing this due to the trackbed through the former station being part of a private residence and has led to the CHR waiting to buy the former station building, although part of the section south to Pant has been rebuilt as a heritage railway. This is what has led to the heritage railway being unable to reconnect with the line to Oswestry.

References

Further reading

Disused railway stations in Shropshire
Railway stations in Great Britain opened in 1860
Railway stations in Great Britain closed in 1965
Former Cambrian Railway stations
Beeching closures in England